Felix Platte (born 11 February 1996) is a German professional footballer who plays as a striker for SC Paderborn.

Club career

Schalke 04
Platte joined the youth academy (Nachwuchsleistungszentrum) of Schalke 04 in 2012 from SC Paderborn 07 and attended the Gesamtschule Berger Feld. He made his Bundesliga debut on 14 February 2015 against Eintracht Frankfurt in a 1–0 away defeat. He replaced Kevin-Prince Boateng after 79 minutes. He then put on a great performance, and nearly leveled the scores – if it was not for the crossbar – against defending champions Real Madrid in the Champions League knockout stage after coming on early in the first half for injured hit-man Klaas-Jan Huntelaar.

Loan to Darmstadt 98
He was loaned to Darmstadt 98 on 1 February 2016.

Darmstadt 98
On 26 August 2017, Darmstadt 98 announced the permanent capture of Platte on a four-year contract.

International career
Platte is a German youth international.

Career statistics

 1.Includes UEFA Champions League.

Honours
Germany
 UEFA European Under-21 Championship: 2017

References

External links
 

1996 births
Living people
People from Höxter
Sportspeople from Detmold (region)
Association football forwards
German footballers
Footballers from North Rhine-Westphalia
Germany youth international footballers
Germany under-21 international footballers
Bundesliga players
2. Bundesliga players
Regionalliga players
FC Schalke 04 players
FC Schalke 04 II players
SV Darmstadt 98 players
SC Paderborn 07 players
People educated at the Gesamtschule Berger Feld